The 2022 Russian regional elections took place in Russia on 11 September 2022.

Gubernatorial 

2022 Adygea head election
2022 Buryatia head election
2022 Karelia head election
2022 Mari El head election
2022 Udmurtia head election
2022 Kaliningrad Oblast gubernatorial election
2022 Kirov Oblast gubernatorial election
2022 Novgorod Oblast gubernatorial election
2022 Ryazan Oblast gubernatorial election
2022 Saratov Oblast gubernatorial election
2022 Sverdlovsk Oblast gubernatorial election
2022 Tambov Oblast gubernatorial election
2022 Tomsk Oblast gubernatorial election
2022 Vladimir Oblast gubernatorial election
2022 Yaroslavl Oblast gubernatorial election

Legislative

See also 
 2022 Moscow municipal elections
 2022 Russian-occupied Ukraine annexation referendums

References 

2022 elections in Russia
Regional elections in Russia